The 2021–22 Tahiti Ligue 1 is the 75th season of the Tahiti Ligue 1, the top-flight football league in Tahiti. The season started on 5 November 2021. A.S. Pirae are the defending champions.

Teams
A total of twelve teams compete in the league. Tamarii Punaruu and A.S. Temanava were promoted from 2020 to 2021 Ligue 2, replacing Manu-Ura, Arue and Jeunes Tahitiens .

Stadium and locations
Note: Table lists in alphabetical order.

Personnel and sponsoring
Note: Flags indicate national team as has been defined under FIFA eligibility rules. Players may hold more than one non-FIFA nationality.

League table

Regular season

C=Champion
R=Relegated

Top scorers

Most goals in a single game
 8 goals:
 Teaonui Tehau (Vénus) 0-15 against Mataiea, round 17, 28 May 2022.

Hat-tricks

References

External links
Fédération Tahitienne de Football
, FTF
Sports Tahiti

Tahiti Ligue 1 seasons
Tahiti Ligue 1